Canadian Championships refers to a number of national-level competition in Canada. It may refer to:

 Canadian Championship, a soccer tournament 
 Canadian Figure Skating Championships
 Canadian Professional Figure Skating Championships
 Canadian Gymnastics Championships
 Canadian National Tennis Championship
 Canadian National Badminton Championships
 Canadian National Pond Hockey Championships
 Canadian Mixed Curling Championship
 Canadian Senior Curling Championships
 Canadian Masters Curling Championships
 Canadian Amateur Championship, of golf
 Canadian Tour Championship, of pro-golf
 Canadian Touring Car Championship
 Canadian Rally Championship
 Canadian Superbike Championship
 Canadian Rugby Championship
 Rugby Canada National Junior Championship
 Canadian National Road Race Championships, of cycling
 Canadian National Time Trial Championships, of cycling
 Canadian Synchronized Skating Championships
 Canadian International Heavyweight Championship, of wrestling
 Canadian International Tag Team Championship, of wrestling
 Canadian Swing Championships, of dance
 Canadian Ultimate Championships, of frisbee
 Canadian Chess Championship, the closed championship
 Canadian Open Chess Championship
 Canadian National Scrabble Championship

Athletics Canada Championships
Canadian Track and Field Championships
Canadian Junior Track and Field Championships
Legion National Youth Track and Field Championships
AC Indoor Open
Canadian Marathon Championships
Canadian Half Marathon Championships
Canadian 10Km Road Race Championships
Canadian 5Km Road Race Championships
Canadian Cross Country Championships

See also
 Canada Cup (disambiguation)
 Canadian Open (disambiguation)
 Canadian Interuniversity Sport women's ice hockey championship
 Air Canada Championship (1996-2002), golf
 Canadian PGA Championship, of pro golf
 Canadian Collegiate Athletic Association Soccer National Championships
 UWA Canadian Championship, of pro-wrestling
 NWA Canadian Championship (disambiguation), of pro-wrestling